Placidus de Titis (also de Titus, Latinization of Placido de Titi, pseudonym Didacus Prittus Pelusiensis; 1603–1668) was an Olivetan monk and professor of mathematics, physics and astronomy at the University of Pavia from 1657 until his death. Placidus popularized the system  of astrological houses now known as the "Placidian system", current in modern astrology. He did not invent the method; it is acknowledged by the 12th century Hebrew astrologer Abraham Ibn Ezra as the system employed by Ptolemy, an attribution that was accepted by Placidus.

Biography 
Placidus was born in Perugia, into the Titi noble family. His father died early, and he was looked after by his mother Cecilia. He studied at the University of Padua where his uncle Girolamo de Titi was professor of theology. One of his teachers was the astronomer Andrea Argoli. The Duchy of Milan at the time was owned by Habsburg Spain, administered by Archduke Leopold Wilhelm of Austria. The Archduke showed strong interest in science, especially occult sciences of alchemy and astrology, and Placidus dedicated his astrological house tables to him. In 1657 he was appointed professor of mathematics at the University of Pavia, a position he held for the rest of his life. Like his contemporary Jean-Baptiste Morin, Placidus opposed the copernican theory and retained a geocentric perspective, although there have been suggestions that he might have been a closet Copernican.

He died in Pavia in 1668.

English translations of Placidus' Primum Mobile were published by Manoah Sibly (1789) and John Cooper (1814).

Works
 De motibus directionum coelestium mobilium (1641).
 Physiomathematica sive coelestis philosophia (1650), Placidus' magnum opus,  first published as Quaestionum physiomathematicarum libri tres, under the pseudonym of Didacus Prittus Pelusiensis, second edition by C. Francobacci und A. Scirota (pseudonyms of two of Placidus' students,  F. Brunacci and F. M. Onorati).
 
 Nuncius astronomicus (1654).
 Il corriere astronomico (1656).
 Tabulae primi mobilis cum thesibus et canonibus (1657).
 Commentaria in Ptolemaeum de siderum judiciis (1658).
 De siderum judiciis, 2 vols. (1660, 1665).
 
 De diebus decretoriis et aegrorum decubitu, 2 vols.  (1661, 1665).
 Ephemerides coelestium motuum (1661-1665).
 
 Tocco di paragone onde evidentemente appare che l’astrologia nelle parti concesse da S. Chiesa è vera scienza, naturale, nobile, et utile quanto la filosofia (1666), in defense of astrology as a natural science.

Notes

Further reading
 
 
 Gansten, Martin. 2011. “Placidean Teachings in Early Nineteenth-Century Britain: John Worsdale and Thomas Oxley.” In Astrologies: Plurality and Diversity: The Proceedings of the Eighth Annual Conference of the Sophia Centre for the Study of Cosmology in Culture, University of Wales, Trinity Saint David, 24–25 July 2010, ed. Nicholas Campion and Liz Green. Ceredigion: Sophia Centre Press.
 

17th-century Italian astronomers
17th-century Italian Christian monks
1603 births
1668 deaths
Italian astrologers
People from Perugia
Academic staff of the University of Pavia